NGC 7026 is a planetary nebula located 6000 light-years away, in the constellation of Cygnus. The central star of the planetary nebula has a spectral type of [WO3], indicating a spectrum similar to that of an oxygen-rich Wolf–Rayet star. An analysis of Gaia data suggests that it is a binary system.

References

External links 
 

Cygnus (constellation)
7026
Planetary nebulae